"Tied Up" is a song recorded by English-born Australian singer Olivia Newton-John for her second greatest hits album Olivia's Greatest Hits Vol. 2 (1982). Written by John Farrar and Lee Ritenour, and produced by the former, the song was the second single released from the album, following "Heart Attack". "Tied Up" reached number 38 on the US Billboard Hot 100.

The song also features Tom Scott on horns, who also was the opening act for Newton-John's 1982 Physical Tour.

Billboard called it a "heavily textured production that's strong on bass drums and echoey vocal tracks."
 
Ritenour also recorded the song for his 1982 album Rit 2, with Eric Tagg performing vocals.

Charts

References

1983 singles
Olivia Newton-John songs
MCA Records singles
Songs written by John Farrar
Song recordings produced by John Farrar
Songs written by Lee Ritenour